Christopher Jose Cooper (born 17 November, 1966), professionally known as Soup the Chemist, and Super C, is an American Christian hip hop musician, and a pioneer of the Christian hip hop movement. He was a member of the hip hop group Soldiers for Christ, also known as S.F.C., and, as a solo artist, has released two studio albums, Dust, in 2000 through BEC Recordings and Eargasmic Arrangements, in 2003 through his own Beesyde Records label. He published an autobiography, Through My Windows, in 2014, through Dimlights Publishing.

Early life
Christopher Jose Cooper was born on 17 November, 1966, in New York, to father George Muhammad L. Cooper and mother Joyce L. Cooper, now Jacquet (née Washington), whose grandmother was Lucretia Lee Washington. He moved to and was raised at Rancho Cucamonga, California, and graduated from Cajon High School in 1984.

Career
His music career began in 1984, when he graduated from high school. Cooper's pursuit of Christian hip hop became evident after he watched the film, Wild Style, regarded as the original hip hop music and culture movie. Among Cooper's earliest influences are old school rap acts such as Double Trouble, Run DMC, and EPMD.  Then known as Super C, he formed the hip hop group Soldiers for Christ, also known as S.F.C., which, alongside groups such as Freedom of Soul and P.I.D., helped pioneer Christian hip hop. Under Cooper's auspices, the group released four studio albums. Because of his pioneering role in the genre, he is sometimes called the "Godfather of Christian hip hop". He released a studio album, Dust, on 31 January, 2000, through BEC Recordings. The song "As the Sun Rises" from Dust features Jon Gibson and samples "Dust in the Wind" by Kansas. The song "Is This a Dream" from the album is the third of Chris Well's five songs in the October 2006 issue of CCM Magazine that is reported to "cast out fear". Cooper wrote an autobiography, Through My Windows, published on 3 February , 2014 through Dimlights Publishing.

Discography
Studio albums
 Dust  (31 January, 2000, BEC)
 Eargasmic Arrangements (2003, Beesyde Records)

References

External links
 Holy Hip Hop DataBase profile
 CMnexus profile

1966 births
Living people
African-American rappers
African-American Christians
Performers of Christian hip hop music
Rappers from New York (state)
Rappers from California
People from Rancho Cucamonga, California
21st-century American rappers
20th-century American rappers
20th-century African-American musicians
21st-century African-American musicians